Căpăţâneşti may refer to several places in Romania:

 Căpăţâneşti, a village in Mărăcineni Commune, Buzău County
 Căpăţâneşti, a village in Broşteni Commune, Mehedinţi County

See also 
 Căpățâneni, a village in Argeș County, Romania